The Western Airplane King Bird, named after the tyrant flycatcher (Western) Kingbird, was a 1920s US civil transport accommodating three passengers in open cockpits. Only one was built.

Design and development

The King Bird was a single bay biplane with wings of rectangular plan. The areas of the  upper and lower wings were equal but the lower span was  greater as they were attached to the fuselage rather than joined directly. They were braced together by inward-leaning, parallel pairs of interplane struts and supported over the fuselage on short, inverted-V cabane struts, producing a  gap with  stagger. Only the lower wing was set with dihedral (3°). Ailerons on upper and lower wings were externally interconnected.

The King Bird's fuselage had a welded steel tube structure, with the engine on a bolt-on forward frame so that various types could be fitted. Each bank of cylinder heads had its own cowling and long exhaust pipes extended away from and below the fuselage. There were two open cockpits, each with bench seats for two, the forward one under the upper trailing edge. It was normally flown from the port side, rear seat but a second set of controls could be added to the other rear seat for pilot training. The elevator was ground adjustable, though production aircraft would have offered an in-flight adjustable option. The rounded, balanced rudder also had a steel tube structure.

The King Bird's fixed undercarriage was conventional for the time, with wire-spoked, rubber-tyred wheels on a single axle which was mounted on short main legs with trailing drag struts.

Operational history

The King Bird was first flown before February 1927. By then it had been flown by several pilots, who commented on its good handling and quick rate of climb after take-off. Despite the good reports, only one was built.

Specifications

References

Single-engined tractor aircraft
Biplanes
1920s United States civil aircraft